Don "Tuffy" Mullison (July 4, 1924 – September 13, 2014) was an American football coach.  He served as the head football coach at Colorado State University from 1956 to 1961. Mullison played football for the Colorado A&M Aggies in 1942 before serving in the Pacific during World War II. He returned to Colorado A&M in 1946 playing until 1948 and was a member of Bob Davis' Raisin Bowl team. A champion wrestler also, Mullison returned to Colorado A&M as the assistant line coach in football in 1952. He helped Davis guide the 1955 Aggies to the Skyline Conference championship in 1955 before being named the head coach of football in 1956. He coached the football program until he was fired in December 1961.

Head coaching record

References

1924 births
2013 deaths
American football guards
Colorado State Rams football coaches
Colorado State Rams football players
American military personnel of World War II
People from Fort Morgan, Colorado